Victorino Montaño Mapa (February 25, 1855 – April 12, 1927) was an Associate Justice of the Supreme Court of the Philippines and later, as the second Chief Justice of the Supreme Court of the Philippines under the American colonial Insular Government.

Career
He was homeschooled during his childhood. Later, he earned his Bachelor of Arts from Colegio de San Juan de Letran and his degree of Bachelor of Laws and Jurisprudence from the University of Santo Tomas at the age of 25.

He was appointed an associate justice of the newly created Supreme Court of the Philippines in 1901, together with Cayetano Arellano and Florentino Torres. He left the Supreme Court to be Secretary of Finance and Justice in 1913 during which he also served on the Philippine Commission, the upper house of the Philippine Legislature.

Upon Arellano's retirement in 1920, he was appointed the second Chief Justice. His tenure was brief, as his frail health forced him to retire early on October 31, 1921. He died on April 12, 1927. On April 29, or 17 days later, his fellow retired justice, Florentino Torres, also died.

Legacy
Victorino Mapa High School, Victorino Mapa Street, and the nearby V. Mapa LRT Station, all in Manila, are named after him.

References

Bibliography
 Cruz, Isagani A. (2000). Res Gestae: A Brief History of the Supreme Court. Rex Book Store, Manila
Philippine Reports, Volume 49 (In Memoriam)

Chief justices of the Supreme Court of the Philippines
Secretaries of Finance of the Philippines
Secretaries of Justice of the Philippines
Colegio de San Juan de Letran alumni
People from Aklan
1855 births
1927 deaths
Burials at La Loma Cemetery
Members of the Philippine Commission
Associate Justices of the Supreme Court of the Philippines